Lasioderma serricorne, commonly known as the cigarette beetle, cigar beetle, or tobacco beetle, is an insect very similar in appearance to the drugstore beetle (Stegobium paniceum) and the common furniture beetle (Anobium punctatum). All three species belong to the family Ptinidae.

L. serricorne is around 2–3 mm long, and brown in colour. The beetles, which can fly, live 2–6 weeks and do not feed as adults. They can be distinguished from A. punctatum by the fact that A. punctatum has a thorax with a pronounced "humped" shape. S. paniceum and L. serricorne have thoraces which have a much less obtuse looking angle when viewed from the side compared to A. punctatum, and thus could be difficult to tell apart. However S. paniceum has a distinct three-segmented "club" at the end of each antenna whereas L. serricorne has uniformly serrated antennae of 11 segments. L. serricorne also has much weaker punctures on the surface of the wing covers (elytra) than the other two species.

As indicated by its common name, the cigarette beetle is a pest of tobacco, both in the refined cigarette packet presentation and also as stored in hogsheads and bales, but is also a minor pest of oilcake, oilseeds, cereals, dried fruit, sage, flour, and some animal products.

Life cycle
The female beetle lays around 100 eggs loosely on the substrate to be fed upon. The larvae are active and will move around on and bore into the product, feeding as they go. The complete life cycle takes 26 days at 37 °C and 120 days at 20 °C. L. serricorne cannot tolerate the cold; adults die within 6 days at 4 °C, and eggs survive 5 days at 0–5 °C. The cigarette beetle's larvae can be distinguished with difficulty from the grubs of the drugstore beetle, most easily by their longer hair and dark head capsule.

The beetles carry a symbiotic yeast, Symbiotaphrina kochii, that is transmitted to the next generation superficially on the eggs and carried internally in larvae and adults in the mycetome, a specialized organ that is linked to the gut.  The yeast cells assist in the digestion of less nutritious foods, supply needed B-vitamins and sterols, and provide resistance to certain toxins.

Infestation

Tobacco and its related products can be infested by Lasioderma serricorne and Ephestia elutella (tobacco moth), which are the most widespread and damaging pests for the tobacco industry. Infestation can range from the tobacco cultivated in the fields to the leaves used for manufacturing cigars, cigarillos, cigarettes, etc.

Control in commercial/industrial settings

Insect monitoring traps are available for L. serricorne, which contain specific pheromones to attract male beetles, and help detect and monitor infestations. Infested bulk tobacco in the form of bales or hogsheads can be fumigated using methyl bromide or phosphine.

Dosage rates and treatment times with methyl bromide are 20 grams/m3 at 21 °C above and 32 grams/m3 for 48–72 hours at 7–20 °C. Methyl bromide is not recommended for cigar tobacco since it can produce off odours in the product.

With phosphine dosage rates are one gram of phosphine (equivalent to a 3-gram table) per m3 for 5 days at 12–15 °C and 4 days at 16–20 °C and 3 days above 20 °C.

For localised or household-level infestations the preferred control measure is to find the infested product, dispose of it, and treat around the area with a residual insecticide such as cypermethrin to kill off any remaining beetles.

References

External links
 What is the Tobacco Beetle?
 Cornell Cooperative Extension Fact Sheet
cigarette beetle on the UF / IFAS Featured Creatures Web site
ZinRus High resolution photo

Woodboring beetles
Anobiidae
Beetles described in 1792